Eunice Hutto Morelock (December 18, 1904 – August 22, 1947) was a pioneer professor at Bob Jones College and possibly the first female chief academic officer of a coeducational college in the United States.

Biography
Hutto was born and reared in Ariton, Alabama, where her father owned the general store.  She entered the Women's College of Montgomery (later Huntingdon College) at age 14 and graduated in 1923, at 18, the youngest member of her class.  In 1929, Hutto completed a master's degree in mathematics at the University of Alabama, and in 1939 she received an honorary doctor of pedagogy degree from Westminster College, New Wilmington, Pennsylvania.

In 1928, after teaching mathematics in the Alabama public schools for five years, Hutto joined the faculty of the one-year-old Bob Jones College, then located near Lynn Haven, Bay County, Florida.  According to her colleague R. K. Johnson, Hutto "seemed to catch a glimpse of the vision" of college founder, evangelist Bob Jones, Sr.  Hutto served as principal of Bob Jones Academy, 1931–36, and dean of the college, 1933–41.

According to Bob Jones, Jr., Hutto was "strong [and] could be stubborn." Her impact on the fledgling college was immediate.  As dean she was "tough-minded and unyielding to pressure," standardizing the curriculum and perceptively evaluating the faculty.  She quickly gained the confidence of Bob Jones, Sr., who treated her as a member of his official family.  Jones deferred to Hutto in "the technical educational work," and he noted in a 1935 chapel service that the two "check[ed] each other.  I might turn this school into a camp meeting, but Miss Hutto says, ‘No, this is a college.’  So she keeps me reminded that this is a college, and I keep her reminded that we have to keep our religion." Hutto believed that she was the only female dean of a coeducational college in the United States.

In September 1941, Hutto resigned to marry Jefferson Davis Morelock, Jr., a businessman from Cleveland, Tennessee, where BJC had moved in 1933.   On her resignation as dean, Jones, Sr. named her to the BJC Board of Trustees.  She returned to BJC to teach mathematics from 1943 to 1947.

Morelock died of leukemia on August 22, 1947, eight months after giving birth to a son, Jefferson Davis Morelock III.  A building in the Academy Quadrangle of Bob Jones University, Greenville, South Carolina, is named for her.

Notes

References
 
R. K. Johnson, Builder of Bridges: The Biography of Dr Bob Jones Sr (Bob Jones University Press, 1969).
Daniel L. Turner, Reflecting God’s Light (Greenville, SC: Bob Jones University, 2001)
Daniel L. Turner, Standing Without Apology: The History of Bob Jones University (Bob Jones University Press, 1997).

1904 births
1947 deaths
Christian fundamentalists
Huntingdon College alumni
People from Cleveland, Tennessee
People from Dale County, Alabama
Bob Jones University faculty
Deaths from leukemia
University of Alabama alumni
Schoolteachers from Alabama
20th-century American women educators
20th-century American educators
American women academics